Kunal Rohidas Patil is a member of the 14th Maharashtra Legislative Assembly.He won this constituency in a row second time for MLA . He represents the Dhule Rural Assembly Constituency. He belongs to the Indian National Congress. He is the son of Indian National Congress leader and former minister Rohidas Patil. 

He won the Dhule Rural constituency in 2019 in Maharashtra Assembly elections by 14564 votes against BJP candidate Dnyanjyoti Manohar Patil(Bhadane).

Also, on the orders of Congress party leaders, contested the Lok Sabha elections in 2019 in Dhule Lok Sabha constituency 

On 22 March 2017, Patil was suspended along with 18 other MLAs until 31 December for interrupting Maharashtra Finance Minister Sudhir Mungantiwar during a state budget session and burning copies of the budget outside the assembly four days earlier.

Patil has been chairman of Shivaji Vidya Prasarak Sanstha, an over hundred year old educational institution based in Dhule. and celebrated Golden Jubilee last year. The Sanstha runs all the professional courses from Primary education to Engineering College, Polytechnic, Arts, Commerce and Science Colleges and 40 schools in the district.

References

1974 births
Living people
Maharashtra MLAs 2014–2019
People from Dhule
Marathi politicians
Maharashtra MLAs 2019–2024
Indian National Congress politicians from Maharashtra